Toshinari is a masculine Japanese given name.

Possible writings
Toshinari can be written using different combinations of kanji characters. Some examples:

敏成, "agile, turn into"
敏也, "agile, to be"
敏為, "agile, do"
敏形, "agile, shape"
俊成, "talented, turn into"
俊也, "talented, to be"
俊為, "talented, do"
俊形, "talented, shape"
利成, "benefit, turn into"
利也, "benefit, to be"
利為, "benefit, do"
利形, "benefit, shape"
年成, "year, turn into"
年也, "year, to be"
寿成, "long life, turn into"
寿也, "long life, to be"

The name can also be written in hiragana としなり or katakana トシナリ.

Notable people with the name
Toshinari Fukamachi (深町 寿成), Japanese voice actor.
Toshinari Maeda (前田 利為, 1885–1942), Japanese general.
Toshinari Fujiwara (藤原 俊成, 1114–1204), better known as Fujiwara no Shunzei, poet and nobleman of ancient Japan.
Toshinari Suwa (諏訪 利成, born 1977), member of the men's marathon team for Japan in the 2004 Summer Olympics.
Toshinari Takaoka (高岡 寿成, born 1970), Japanese long-distance runner.

Fictional characters
Toshinari Seki (関 俊成), from manga and anime Tonari no Seki-kun (aka My Neighbor Seki).

Japanese masculine given names